The National Museum of Serbia is the largest and oldest museum in Belgrade, Serbia. It is located in the central zone of Belgrade on a square plot between the Republic Square, formerly Theatre Square, and three streets: Čika Ljubina, Vasina and Laze Pačua. Its main facade is on the Republic Square and the official address ia 1a Republic Square.

The museum was established on 10 May 1844. It moved into the present building in 1950, with the grand opening of the venue on 23 May 1952. Since its founding, the museum's collection has grown to over 400,000 objects, including many foreign masterpieces.

The National Museum of Serbia  building was declared a Monument of Culture of Great Importance in 1979.

History 
Before the erection of the building of the National Museum on this place was a famous tavern called "Dardanelles", meeting point of the cultural and artistic elite of the time. Demolition of the old tavern signified the beginning of the transformation of The Republic Square. The building which housed the most important museum of the Republic of Serbia today originally was built from 1902 to 1903, for the purpose of Fund Mortgage Bank, one of the oldest banking institutions of Belgrade. The building was constructed according to the design of architects Andra Stevanović and Nikola Nestorović after a competition on which they received the first prize. It was one of the first buildings in which was used some form of reinforced concrete for the foundation. Actually, during the digging foundation trenches, the various pits, wells and basements were encountered because of the proximity of the former Stambol Gate. The newly built two-storeyed building was a real palace of its time. Its volume conception designed in the form of a long solid block with domes over the central and lateral Rizal sites and academic façade shape was based on the principles of neo-Renaissance style with neo-baroque elements on the domes. The greatest attention was given to the monumental staircase and the hall with bank windows which as the basic premises of a bank was given secondary importance. Almost three decades later, the increased development of Mortgage Bank, influenced a need for a reconstruction of the building. The extension was made without competition by architect Vojin Petrović, who designed the added wing and atrium facing the street Laze Paču. The new part of the building contained the same elements of interior as the old part, and in the final image, the building got two monumental staircases and two halls with bank windows while only the upper floors form the continuous line of offices. During World War II Mortgage Bank building was bombed and the central part with the dome was destroyed. After the war, the building got a completely new purpose when one of the most important national cultural institutions moved in.

Since its establishment during the Constitutionalist, until the end of the Second World War, the National Museum changed location several times. At a beginning, it was placed in Captain Miša's building (1863) and soon after it was moved into two adjacent buildings which were destroyed during World War I. At the same time, the museum art collections were seized and looted by the invaders. During the interwar period, the museum didn't get its own building. The museum was located in a rented private house at 58 Kneza Miloša street. In 1935 the New Royal Palacе became the residence of the museum and named the Royal Museum. Subsequently, it was renamed into the Museum of Prince Paul which consisted of Historical Museum and the Museum of Contemporary Art (founded in 1929), which merged in 1935.

The museum managed to avoid destruction during the initial Nazi bombing of Belgrade in April 1941. Professor and major  noted this in his 1941 report. He was head of the Referat for the Protection of the Cultural Values in Serbia, a local offshoot of the German Kunstschutz. Von Reiswitz inspected the museum, noting that 100,000 exhibits are preserved, except for some items which went missing in the initial stage of the war: some one hundred coins, eight archaeological artefacts, and two paintings "without greater value".

In 1948 the New Palace was restored and became the administrative seat of the Republic. For that purpose, the museum was transferred into a building of the former Stock Exchange on Student Square, and partly to the Palace of Princess Ljubica. The first architectural competition for the proper National Museum building planned to be on Tašmajdan was announced the following year.

The author of the design was an architect Miladin Prljevic but the Cominiform disapproved of this idea. Then the museum was transferred into the building of Mortgage Bank. After World War II, the first renovation of the bank building was done by architect Dobroslav Pavlovic in 1950 but the overall reconstruction of the building was made 1965–1966 by architects Alexander Deroko, Petar Anagnosti and Zoran Petrović. The central dome was restored and the central tract with offices and workspaces was lifted. After an adaptation, the original hall with bank windows was converted into a library. The originally main and monumental three-way staircase entrance from the Republic Square received an internal character while the other entrance from Vasina street became the main entrance to the museum, which is connected directly to the other hall with bank windows was. In a functional arrangement, the building underwent upgrading doubling space and communications, while in terms of design, maintained the characteristic elements of 1902 and in terms of art as an integral unity. Interior renovation from the sixties of the 20th century was done in such a manner that it is not visible from the outside and it doesn't disturb the communications inside the museum.

2003–2018 reconstruction 

In 2003, the permanent exhibition was dismantled and the building was closed for the impending reconstruction, but the process dragged on for years, including the gaps when nothing was done at all, and by January 2018 the museum was still not open.

On 25 January 2012, after ten years of the National Museum in Belgrade being closed to the public, Vladimir Bogdanović of the leading Serbian newspaper/website Press wrote an article called A decade of cultural genocide against the Serbs, commenting on the need and importance of a working national museum. He also criticized the preservation of the art in the museum. The façade was finished in 2015 and had to be reconstructed to its original look as the building is under the state protection. In mid-2016 the works on the interiors began. The entrance into the museum from the Vasina Street will remain the main entry point, while the exit doors that lead to the Square of the Republic, with its architectural staircase, will be adapted to be the exit point.

The new permanent exhibit will represent the cultural development in this part of Europe from prehistory to the 20th century, with an emphasis on the Serbian cultural heritage. The 18th and 19th centuries art will be exhibited on the first floor, so as the 20th-century Yugoslav art. In the atrium of the building, there are vaults, left from the period when the venue served as a bank, which will be adapted into the exhibition depots. The look of the vault will be preserved and will serve for the presentation of the museum numismatic collection, from the beginning of the coin minting to the 20th century. In addition, a collection of the medallion art will be exhibited here, too.

The construction works should be finished by March 2018, when the preparation and setting of the collections should start.

On 18 June 2018, 10 days before the scheduled opening, reporters from the daily Politika visited the museum. They reported that the venue doesn't look like something to be open in several days, and the employees confirmed that it would take at least six more months to complete everything, but that the museum will be open as scheduled. The reporters were not allowed to photograph everything. Even though the reconstruction projects, by architects Milan Rakočević and Vladimir Lojanica, envisioned several major changes (including the reconstruction of the glass roof and a dome destroyed during the heavy 1944 Allied Easter bombing of Belgrade), nothing was actually changed so after 15 years the building wasn't thoroughly reconstructed as announced, but only refurbished. This way the capacity of the exhibition space wasn't enlarged, so the permanent exhibition will have 3,000 pieces, out of 400,000.

The large mural by Mladen Josić, painted in the 1930s and located on the wall of the mezzanine, was preserved. Josić painted another mural, close to the former dome, but was destroyed in the 1944 bombing.  One of the remnants of the 1966 reconstruction, when the museum was managed by Lazar Trifunović,  is a window decorated with the wrought iron. The window was originally facing outside until 1933 when the annex was added to the building.

Re-opening and name change

The National Museum in Belgrade was officially re-opened on 28 June 2018. The grand re-opening ceremony included projections on the building's facade, as well as a promotional video featuring famous Ukrainian ballet dancer Sergei Polunin.

National Museum in Belgrade was renamed to National Museum of Serbia, on 8 April 2021.

Today 
The National Museum of Serbia is a representative public building, monumental in size and volume, as well as its external shape and style. That is especially visible in the entrance area with twin columns and magnificent dome. All the facades characterized by polychrome ornaments neo-Renaissance origin. Monumentality is also reflected in the interior with rich decoration done by famous artists of the time: Andrea Domenico (also known as a painter of decorative wall painting that is in the interior of the building of the Old Palace), Franz Valdman and Bora Kovacevic.

Because of its architectural and cultural, urban and historical value building of the National Museum in Belgrade is established for the cultural heritage monument of great importance for the Republic of Serbia.

Collections 
The museum has 34 archeological, numismatic, artistic and historical collections today.

Archeological collections 
The main collection consists of sculptures from Vinca (6th–5th millennium BC) such as Lady of Vinča and Lepenski Vir (7th millennium BC).
There are also numerous sculptures, weapons, helmets and other items from ancient Rome, 1005 items from ancient Greece and various items of Celtic origin. The most valuable pieces from that period are Dupljaja Chariot (16th–13th century BC), golden masks from Trebeništa (6th century BC), household sets from Jabučje (1st century AD), the Belgrade Cameo (4th century) and a Silver belt with swastika (5th century BC).
There is also a collection from ancient Egypt. The most famous piece is a rare gold sarcophagus and mummy of the Egyptian priest Nesmin.

Numismatics 
The Numismatic Collection has more than 300,000 items (coins, medals, rings, seals). The collection is divided into ten smaller assemblies from 6th–5th century BC, and includes a collection of coins issued by Philip II of Macedon (359–336 BC) and Alexander the Great (336–323 BC). The collection also contains unique items: a golden medallion of Emperor Valentinian I, minted 364 AD, silver Dinars from the reign of King Stefan Radoslav of Serbia, and others.

Medieval collection 

The museum also holds a large collection of medieval artifacts, mostly from Europe and Asia. The most important is the illustrated 362 page manuscript of the Miroslav Gospels written in 1186 in Kingdom of Serbia (medieval). The manuscript was entered into UNESCO's Memory of the World Register in recognition of its historical value.
The collection also includes the sarcophagus of Saint King Stefan Decanski from the 14th century, rings belonging to the Serbian Queen Theodora (before 1322) and King Stephen Radoslav of Serbia (1219–20), King Milutin's mantle from the 1300s, the Eulogy to Prince Lazar – Euphemia's famous embroidery from 1402, about 120 icons from 1200 to 1500, including the Ohrid collection.

Art collection 

The Collection of Drawings and Prints of International Artists has 2,446 items and the Yugoslav Art Collection has more than 6,000 items, including 1,700 paintings of Serbian authors from 18th to 19th century and 3,000 paintings from the 20th century. This does not include the Serbian Medieval Art Collection.
The museum includes Serbian medieval, French, Dutch, Flemish, Italian, Russian, German, Japanese, Chinese (from 1644 to 1978), English, Spanish, Hungarian, Romanian, Bulgarian, Yugoslav and miscellaneous art collections. In total the collection numbers some 16,000 paintings, graphics, drawings, icons and prints, plus over 900 sculptures.

The French masters collection is the National Museum's most significant holding. It comprises extremely rare pieces from Matisse, Picasso, Renoir, Rouault, Degas, Cézanne and others. Most of these paintings were collected and donated by Prince Paul of Yugoslavia. Erih Šlomović, a young Belgrader born at the turn of the 20th century, became in his youth the protégé of the world's biggest art merchant, Ambroise Vollard. The connection led him to develop his own collection, comprising a total of 600 pieces by 1941. The Šlomović Collection is the largest and richest collection of French art in the Balkans, as well as one of the most beautiful in the world.

Italian art collection 

The Italian Art Collection, consisting of more than 230 works of art, is famous for containing creative works from individual masters and artistic workshops from the 14th to the 20th century. They include works by Domenico Veneziano, Giovanni di Paolo, Raphael, Titian, Tintoretto, Domenico Robusti, Vittore Carpaccio, Lorenzo di Credi, Guido Reni, Spinello Aretino, Francesco Bassano the Younger, Leandro Bassano, Giovanni Battista Tiepolo, Canaletto, Francesco Guardi, Giulio Carpioni, Andrea Celesti, Biagio Faggioni etc. The graphic and etching collection includes work by Botticelli, Annibale Carracci, Giovanni Battista Piranesi, Paolo Veronese, Amedeo Modigliani, Luigi Ontani, Guglielmo Achille Cavellini, Giuseppe Pinot-Gallizio, and others.

Highlights in the museum include:
Paolo Veneziano, Madonna and Child (Tempera on panel, c. 1324),
Paolo di Giovanni Fei, Madonna with Christ on the Throne (triptych 48 x 45 cm c.1390)
Lorenzo Veneziano, Nativité (Tempera – 76.3 x 54.8 cm)
Giovanni Di Paolo, Lord and Three Angels (tempera 54 x 27 cm)
Raphael attribution, Madonna with Christ and small St.John, 114x116 cm
Andrea Solari, Christ Ecce Hommo
Lorenzo di Credi, Adoration (d: 96 cm – tempera, c. 1500)
Vittore Carpaccio, Holy Pilgrim (110x37cm-part of polyptych) and St. Sebastian (108 x 36 cm – 1495 – part of polyptych)
Titian, Nicolas Vicarius Portrait (canvas 200x100cm), Portrait of Catherine of Austria  (Oil on canvas – 110 x 83 cm)
Tintoretto, Madonna and Child with Donor  (oil on canvas, d: 158 cm, 1524)
Leonello Spada, Judith and Halophen (canvas 220x150 cm)
Domenico Robusti, Portrait of Venetian (canvas 200x127cm)
Giovanni Battista Tiepolo, Saint Family, Collecting Mana attributed (oil on canvas)
Canaletto, A view of the Grand Canal (oil on canvas 60 x 95 cm)
Francesco Guardi, Plaza San Marco, Venice (oil on canvas 75 x 99 cm −1765)

Dutch and Flemish collection 

The Dutch and Flemish collection consists of more than 500 works (210 paintings of art and 220 graphics and engravings, and over 80 drawings). The National Museum in Belgrade was the first museum in the world to include a Piet Mondrian painting in its permanent display. Represented artists include Juan de Flandes, Hieronymus Bosch, Cornelis de Vos, Anthony van Dyck, Antonis Mor, Jan Brueghel the Elder, Marten de Vos, Joos van Cleve, Jan Antonisz. van Ravesteyn, Rubens, Jan van Goyen, Justus Sustermans, Simon de Vos, Jan Victors, Willem van Aelst, Frans van Mieris, Sr., Paulus Potter, Caspar Netscher, Jan Frans van Bloemen, Adam Frans van der Meulen, Godfried Schalcken, Adriaen van Utrecht, Johan Jongkind, Kees van Dongen, Anton Mauve, Allart van Everdingen, Vincent van Gogh and Piet Mondrian.

Highlights in the museum include:
Juan de Flandes, Saint John the Baptist Sermon, (oil on wood, c. 1497, 80×52 cm)
Hieronymus Bosch, The Temptation of Saint Anthony, (tempera on panel, 52x×39 cm)
Joos van Cleve, Portrait of a man with the rosary, (oil on panel, 58×41 cm)
Antonis Mor,  Portrait of Spanish Nobleman (oil on canvas, 130x105cm)
Marten de Vos, Paradise (oil on panel, 160 x 205 cm),
Peter Paul Rubens, Diana gifts catch to Pan (oil on canvas, 145×211.5 cm, c.1615)
Jan Brueghel the Elder, Flowers (oil on canvas 66×50 cm, 1616)
Cornelis de Vos, Portrait of Young Girl
Frans van Mieris, Sr., The Music Lesson (oil on panel, 35×29 cm)
Jan van Goyen, Landscape (oil on panel, 47×67 cm)
Adriaen van der Werff, Flute Lessons
Vincent van Gogh, Peasant Woman Standing Indoors (oil on panel, 42×28 cm)
Kees van Dongen, Portrait of Lady Mini Monne
Piet Mondrian, Composition II (oil on canvas, 45×45 cm)

French art collection 

The French Art Collection consists of more than 250 paintings and more than 400 graphics and drawings, from the 16th to early 20th century, including the Slomovic Collection (58 paintings and over 200 graphics). Among the French painters represented in the collection are Nicolas Tournier, Robert Tournières, Hubert Robert, Gauguin, Renoir, Lautrec, Matisse, Monet, Cézanne, Degas, Corot, Paul Signac, Maurice Utrillo, Rodin, Georges Rouault, Pierre Bonnard, Pissarro, Redon, Gustave Moreau, Honoré Daumier, Eugène Carrière, Maurice de Vlaminck, André Derain, Suzanne Valadon, Forain, Robert Delaunay, Rosa Bonheur, Marie Laurencin, Félix Ziem. The graphic and etching collection includes work by Charles Le Brun, Sébastien Bourdon, Jacques Callot, Charles-François Daubigny, Degas, Delacroix, Jean-Baptiste-Camille Corot, Le Corbusier (3 graphic), Renoir, Jean Cocteau, Eugène Carrière, etc. .

Some of the museum French Highlights are:
Nicolas Tournier, Concert (canvas 120x169cm) (Earlier, attributed to Caravaggio)
Robert Tournières, Regent and Ms De Parabere (canvas 96x130 cm)
Jean-Marc Nattier, Portrait of Lady with Flower (canvas 73x59 cm)
Hubert Robert, Stairway of Farnese Palace Park  (canvas 217x149cm)
Cézanne, Bathers (watercolor),
Renoir,  Nude (canvas 129.5 cm × 172.7 cm (51 in × 68 in))
Monet, Rouen Cathedral (canvas)
Henri de Toulouse-Lautrec, Female portrait (canvas),
Gauguin, Tahitian girl (oil on canvas – 143 x 98 cm),
Degas, Bust man in soft hat
Pissarro, Place du Theatre Francais-Sun effect (canvas),
Matisse,  Beside the Window (canvas)
Corot, In the Park (canvas) and Landscape from Italy (canvas),
André Derain, Sailboats at Carriéres, (canvas)
Paul Signac, Woman drink a tea (canvas),
Pierre Bonnard, Reading Lady (canvas),
Édouard Vuillard, Interior (tempera),
Robert Delaunay, Runners (canvas)

Russian art collection 

The Russian art collection has 90 paintings, and numerous prints, etchings and was mostly donated by Prince Paul of Yugoslavia. The collection also has over 100 icons from the 15th to the 19th centuries. The collection includes work by painters and sculptors such as Ivan Aivazovsky, Marc Chagall, Kandinsky, Roerich, Repin, Filipp Malyavin, Alexei Harlamov, Mikhail Larionov, Boris Grigoriev, Vladimir Borovikovsky, Pavel Kuznetsov, Konstantin Korovin, Kazimir Malevich, Alexandre Benois, El Lissitzky, Mstislav Dobuzhinsky, Alexander Nikolayevich Samokhvalov, Pyotr Nilus etc.

Some of Russian Art Highlights are:
Orest Kiprensky, Portrait of Emperors Son (canvas)
Ivan Aivazovsky, On the Black Sea Coast (canvas 90×130 cm)
Nicholas Roerich  Holy Guests (canvas 82×153), Church Bells Tolling,
Wassily Kandinsky, Binc on Rugen, Orange 1923.
Ilya Repin, Nikolai Kuznetcov Portrait, Woman dressed traditionally,
Konstantin Makovsky, Portrait of Prince Nikolai Michailovich (canvas 107×73 cm),
Vladimir Borovikovsky, Portrait of Karageorge (1816)
Marc Chagall, Old man and cow,
Alexander Archipenko, Two women
El Lissitzky, Winning over Sun (aquarel)

English art collections 

Includes painters usually from the late 19th century, mostly impressionist and post-impressionist. The vast majority of the collection was donated by Prince Paul of Yugoslavia before World War II. In collection is 64 paintings and watercolors and 51 graphics and etchings. They include painters such as Alfred Sisley, Charles Conder, Philip Wilson Steer, Walter Sickert, Hermione Hammond, James Bolivar Manson, Wyndham Lewis, Roger Fry, Duncan Grant, Vanessa Bell and Rowland Fisher, and graphic works from William Hogarth.

Some of English Art works are:
Charles Jervas, Portrait of Anthony van Dyck
John Constable, Landscape (watercolor)
George Morland, Stable with Boars
Clarkson Frederick Stanfield, Sea with Fishermans Sailboats (1862)
Frank Holl, Return from Walking (1877)
Alfred Sisley, Barges on the Loing
Charles Conder, On the beach
Walter Sickert, Street in Dieppe
George Frederic Watts, Lady Garvagh
James Bolivar Manson, Still Life with Flowers, View from Houton Sussex
Augustus John, Infaint portrait Beatrice
Duncan Grant, Sunny Countryside, Haystacks
William Rothenstein, Laurence of Arabia Portrait 1921 (canvas)
Roger Fry, Nude on the Spring 1921
Vanessa Bell, Roofs

Japanese art collection 

The Japanese Art Collection has 220 works including 36 graphics and paintings (all the graphics belonging to the Ukiyo-e genre, which developed in Japan from the 17th to 19th century – one of the most frequent motifs was the city of Edo). The collection also contains work from Kunisada, Toyokuni, Keisai Eisen, Hiroshige, Utamaro, and Tsuguharu Foujita.

Kunisada: Actor Portraits series, Wind gusts, Act from series Geishas ,
Toyokuni : Actor Portraits series, Kabuki Theater, Lady with friend
Hiroshige: One Hundred Views of Edo (series of graphics), Nihon and Edo bridge, Garden with plum trees, Fashion store in Olema street
Ginko Adaci: Ladies
Sadahida Giokuran, Geisha Hanaogi
Utamaro, Boy and mouse

Austrian and German art collections 

Austrian and German art collection in National Museum in Belgrade has 112 paintings and numerous graphics and etchings. Painters were usually from 19th and 20th century, while graphics are from the 15th century. Most famous painters in collection are Max Liebermann, Lovis Corinth, Fritz von Uhde, Karl Hofer, while prints works include Albrecht Dürer (49 prints), Gustav Klimt, Lovis Corinth, Max Slevogt etc. Most paintings were donated by House of Obrenović and Prince Paul of Yugoslavia. Some of the works are:
Philipp Peter Roos, Shepherd with the Herd (c. 1690)
Peter Strudel, Pan with Puttas (canvas 190 x 99 cm c. 1690)
Georg Philipp Rugendas, Battle from Three Hundred Years' War  (canvas 89x123cm c. 1700)
Jacob Philipp Hackert, Ruins (watercolor 1781)
Franz Krüger, Portrait of Elenore Mayer Gerhard (canvas 1840) and Portrait of Wolf Mayer
Moritz Michael Daffinger, Prince Milos Obrenovic Portrait
Max Liebermann, House with Garden, Flea Market in Munich
Franz Eybl, Portrait of Emillia von Kommeter
Leopold Kupelwieser, Portrait of Man with white collar
Friedrich von Amerling, Portrait of Young Woman
Fritz von Uhde, Woman on the window (1890)
Moise Kisling, Woman in black dress c.1928, Female Act
Max Ernst, Conversation with Himera
Friedrich August von Kaulbach, Head of the Woman (pastel)
Hans Thoma, Landscape in Swarcvald
Ferdinand Georg Waldmüller, Portrait of Ms. Tatichek, Portrair oh Heinrih Tatichek, Portrait of Young Woman
Lovis Corinth, Memory of the ball (aquarell), Forest (ink)
Karl Hofer, Still Life

Others Art Collections

Other Art Collection in National Museum in Belgrade include works from Spain, USA, Bulgaria, Hungary, Poland, Australia, China, Canada etc..Collections include paintings from El Greco, Picasso, Mary Cassatt, Burne Hogarth, Felix Philipp Kanitz, László Moholy-Nagy, Eduardo Arroyo, Erró, Sol LeWitt etc.

Some of works are:
El Greco, Holy Mother of Consolation (1560–1570) {On loan from Serbian Orthodox Church}
Pablo Picasso (13 works), Head of the Woman (oil on canvas), Two Women (watercolor), Interior with Three Figures (drawing), Modest Meal (drawing), Woman with Book (etching), Horseman (drawing), Arlekin (pastel) etc.
Charles Jervas Van Dyck Portrait
Antoni Clavé, Composition I, Composition II and Composition III
Charles Demuth, Flowers
Julius Rolshoven, Female Act
Frederic Porter Vinton, Landscape with the Lake
Theodoor Verstraete, The Pond
Mary Cassatt, (7 pastels), Girl with Cat, Girl and Dog, Woman Holding a Child, etc.
Leon Kroll, Miroslav Spalajković Portrait
Mark Tobey, Hornpipe (oil on cardboard)
Alfred Stevens (painter), Woman gathering shells 1883.
Sol LeWitt, Composition with yellow, blue and red (gouaches)
Neville Lewis, Black Woman
Jules Pascin, Terrace(1920)
Endre Nemes, Visiting Paris (aquarel), Composition (aquarel) and Needlework (canvas)
Aurél Bernáth, Mikulas, (pastel)
Wacław Borowski, After Hunting (canvas 100x86cm)
Roman Artymowski, Pesimistic Landscape (canvas 60x81cm)
Stanisław Witkiewicz, Han Saraj
Kazimierz Sichulski, Conquering Kraków 1025 AD (tempera 150x317cm)
Jaroslav Čermák (painter), Refugies from Herzegovina)
Nikola Marinov, Three Females (watercolor), Two Girls in the Field
Bencho Obreshkov, Bridge over Maritza, Prince Paul of Yugoslavia, Still Life with Cherries, Vase with Blue Flowers, Landscape
Felix Philipp Kanitz, Soko town, Timok Valley, Nis, Janja Tana, Kalna Tana, Timok Gorge and Pirot
Mór Than, Karageorge Murder (1863, 110x142)
Erró, From Mouse Hole, A Moi (serigraphic), No Name Guillotine
Antonio Seguí, Farewell to Arms
Zao Wou Ki, Landscape in Great Valley (watercolor)

Serbian and Yugoslav art collection 

The Serbian and Yugoslav Art Collection consisting of more 6000 pieces created between the 17th and 20th century. Some of the artists represented are: Marina Abramović, Paja Jovanović, Stojan Aralica, Petar Lubarda, Milan Konjović, Uroš Predić, Đura Jakšić, Marko Murat, Đorđe Andrejević Kun, Nadežda Petrović, Petar Dobrović, Mića Popović and Sava Šumanović.
There are also Slovenian Art works with Matija Jama- (7 canvases), Avgust Černigoj – (6 works), Sketch for theater, Rihard Jakopič – (7 canvases) Birch Trees, Ivan Grohar, Na Pasi and Matej Sternen (4 canvases) Female Reader etc.
Teodor Kračun, Christ Resurrection (c. 1780), St. Apostle Thomas, St. Apostle Mark, St. John's Divine and Abraham's Victim
Konstantin Danil, Madonna, Male Portrait, Still Life, Stanci Deli Portrait, Archangel Gabriel, Ms Vajgling Portrait, Ms Tetesi Portrait, General Stevan Knicanin Portrait, Portrait of Lady with Cross and MsWife Sofia Portrait
Paja Jovanović, Crowning of Stefan Dušan, The Wedding of Stefan Dusan, Portrait of Ms. Hudson, Nikola Pašić Portrait, Woman in pink dress, Selling Manasija Monastir model, Ms. Pupin Portrait, Decorating Bride, Arnaut with cibok, The Fencing Lesson, His wife Munie, Portrait of Woman with Hat, The Uprising at Takovo, Stefan Decanski, Sopoćani Monastir, Portrait of Romanian King Ferdinand, Diana, Nude, Portrait of Simington, Portrait of Josip Broz Tito, Furor Teutonicus, Flowers, Cocks fighting, Portrait of Gedeon Dundjerski, Portrait of Ms. Hudson, House in Kars, Traitor, Motive from Celarevo, Marco, Milos and Vila and Prince Lazar
Nadežda Petrović (86 paintings),  Kosovo peonies, Self Portrait
Uroš Predić (13 paintings), Amoretti, Small Philosopher, Fieldmarshal Živojin Mišić Portrait, Saint Sava bless children, Hardworking hands, Cheerful brothers, Konstantin Danil Portrait, Djordje Krstic Portrait, Ljuba Ivanović Portrait, Girl with doll, Orphan  and Refugees from Herzegovina
Đura Jakšić, Self Portrait, Woman in blue dress, Karadjordje Assassination, Prince Milan Obrenovic Portrait, Director Ciric Portrait, Prince Michael on catafalque, Emperor Dusan, Watchtower, St. George, Prince Marco, Banovic Strahinja, Fireworks on the Stambol Gate and Christ on the forest
Beta Vukanović, Summer Day
Uroš Knežević (2 paintings),  Boy with feather
Petar Dobrović (21 paintings) Karlo's Bridge, Monumental Horses on San Marco Square in Venice, Shipan, Adriatic landscape, Ana Trezibašić Portrait
Đorđe Krstić (13 paintings), Woman underneath apple tree, Anatomist, Studenica Monastery, Zica Monastery, Drawn Girl, Djele Kula, On the spring, St. Nickolas, St.George's Oath, Zica Monastery Interior, Babakajand Stalac Capitulation
Marko Murat (28 paintings), Spring and Dubrovnik's Spring
Sava Šumanović (25 paintings, 1 drawing), Sidjanke, Autumn's way, Nude, Bridge in town, Wagtail, Nude on red carpet
Milan Konjović (15 paintings), Stradun, Wheat fields and Toncika
Petar Lubarda (23 painting), Sea's Cliffs
Marina Abramović (4 works), Performans 77, Oblak and his Projection (canvas 130x120), Kisses from Moscow and Exhibition Bologna 1977.

Sculptures 
The museum houses sculptures from the early Roman period to the 20th century. The Yugoslav Collection consists of 850 works and the foreign collection has over 50. The most significant collections come from sculptors such as Ivan Meštrović – (96 works), Toma Rosandic, Antun Augustinčić, Frano Kršinić, César Baldaccini, Aristide Maillol, George Minne, Kai Nielsen (sculptor), Risto Stijović, Matija Vuković and Julije Knifer.
Jules Dalou, Seating Male Figure
Ivan Meštrović (45 works), Angel of Death, Banovic Strahinja Torso (marble), Portrait of Mother (marble), Miloš Obilić, Kosovo girl, Srđa Zlopogleđa, Prince Kraljević Marko, Widow, Remebrance, Widow with Child, Two Widows, The Maiden of Kosovo.
Aristide Maillol, Meditarenian, Nude, Miniature Nude
Jean-Baptiste Carpeaux, Boy with the Shell, Bahantinian Woman, Sitting Male
Toma Rosandic, Turkish Heads, Good and Evil, A Young Woman, Tired Fighter, Stone Thrower
Antun Augustinčić, Bronze Female Nude, Self-Portrait, etc.
George Minne, The Head of the Nun
Frano Kršinić, Female Nude in Marble, Siesta
Kai Nielsen (sculptor), Leda without Swan
Yevgeny Vuchetich, Lenin
Ivan Rendić, After the Bath
Risto Stijović, Young Girl
Simeon Roksandić, Dancing Girl
Sreten Stojanović, Portrait of Father

Gallery

See also 
 Museum of Contemporary Art (Belgrade)
 Monuments of Culture of Great Importance
 Tourism in Serbia

References

External links
 
 

 
Serbia
Cultural Monuments of Great Importance (Serbia)
Office buildings in Serbia
Museums in Serbia